Binbirkilise (literally: Thousand and One Churches) is a region in the antique Lycaonia, in modern Karaman Province of Turkey, known for its around fifty Byzantine church ruins.

The church ruins are situated in and around the settlements Madenşehri, Üçkuyu and Değle.

Buildings
The region was a cultural center of the Byzantine Christians in the era between the 3rd and 8th century. There are remains of churches, monasteries, cisterns, fortifications and habitations that are integrated in the villages. The stone materials were re-used in the today's buildings that caused continuous diminishing of the historical inventory.

From the architecture historical viewpoint, the several domed basilicas of Syriac Orthodox type are interesting. The walls were built of large cut stone blocks. Due to lack of wood in the region, the buildings were topped with stone domed roofs instead of flat wooden roofs. Over the aisles, matronea were constructed behind the upper column row. In apses, there were double clerestory windows. The narthexes have mostly double arcades and are supported by a single column in the center. In some churches, primarily in Madenşehri, remains of murals can be seen. Also rare relicts from the Hittites, Roman and Hellenistic period are found in the surroundings.

History of research work

In 1904, Carl Holzmann (1849–1914) published his Archäologische Skizzen about Binbirkilise. Shortly after, the region was described by British traveller and archaeologist Gertrude Bell (1868–1926), who explored the region in 1905 during her trip through Asia Minor. She published her observations in a series of articles in the Revue Archéologique. During this trip, she met in Konya Scottish archaeologist William Mitchell Ramsay (1851–1939). The two decided to conduct excavations in Binbirkilise that took place in 1907. The results were published along with many photos in their book The Thousand and One Churches.

When Bell returned to the site two years later, she found that a large part of the documented buildings had disappeared as a result of robbery for cut stone. Today, the state of destruction is much advanced as can be seen in comparison with Bell's photos. Turkish art historian Semavi Eyice examined the region and published the result of his research in 1971.

Gallery

Bibliography 
 Carl Holzmann (1904). Binbirkilise: Archäologische Skizzen aus Anatolien: ein Beitrag zur Kunstgeschichte des christlichen Kirchenbaues, Verlag Von Boysen & Maasch
 William Mitchell Ramsay (2008). Gertrude Lowthian Bell, Robert G. Ousterhout: The Thousand and One Churches, University of Pennsylvania Museum of Archaeology and Anthropology, 
 Semavi Eyice (1971). Recherches archéologiques à Karadağ (Binbirkilise) et dans la région de Karaman. Doğan Kardeş

References 

Byzantine church buildings in Turkey
Ruined churches in Turkey
Byzantine sites in Anatolia
Karaman Central District
Former populated places in Turkey
Lycaonia
Archaeological sites in Central Anatolia